Arūnas Mika (born 11 November 1970) is a retired Lithuanian football defender, who last played for Sakalas Siauliai. He obtained a total number of 13 caps for the Lithuania national football team, scoring one goal.

Honours
National Team
 Baltic Cup
 1992

References

profile at klisf.info 

1970 births
Living people
Lithuanian footballers
Lithuanian expatriate footballers
Lithuania international footballers
Association football defenders
FK Sirijus Klaipėda players
FC Anzhi Makhachkala players
Expatriate footballers in Russia
FC Šiauliai players